Scot(t) Bennett may refer to:

Scott Bennett (footballer) (born 1980), Australian rules footballer
Scott Bennett (librarian), Yale University librarian
Scott Bennett (musician), musician for Brian Wilson
Scott M. Bennett (1977–2022), American lawyer and politician
D. Scott Bennett, American political scientist
Scot Bennett (born 1990), English footballer for Newport County
Harry Scott Bennett (1877–1959), Australian socialist speaker and organiser